Hung Jui-chen (born 1 March 1990) is a Taiwanese tennis player.

Hung has a career high ATP singles ranking of 596 achieved on 7 December 2015. He also has a career high ATP doubles ranking of 521 achieved on 14 November 2016. Hung has won 1 ITF singles title and 2 ITF doubles titles.

Hung has represented Chinese Taipei at the Davis Cup where he has a W/L record of 4–7.

External links

1990 births
Living people
Taiwanese male tennis players
People from Nantou County
21st-century Taiwanese people